Woy or WOY may refer to:

 Wander Over Yonder, American television series
 Asele Woy, Nigerian sprinter
 Roy Jenkins, British politician sometimes nicknamed “Woy”
 Roy Hodgson, former British football manager sometimes nicknamed "Woy"
 Woy Woy, New South Wales, Australian town

See also 
 WOYS